Senator Dyer may refer to:

Buddy Dyer (born 1958), Florida State Senate
Elisha Dyer Jr. (1839–1906), Rhode Island State Senate
Myles P. Dyer (1887–1969), Missouri State Senate
Ross W. Dyer (1911–1993), Tennessee State Senate
Trusten P. Dyer (1856–1926), Washington State Senate

See also
Senator Dwyer (disambiguation)